Thankful is the fourth album by the American singer Natalie Cole. It was released on November 16, 1977, by Capitol Records. In 1978, the album's first single, "Our Love", peaked at No. 10 on the U.S. Billboard Hot 100 and topped the Hot R&B chart.

Track listing

Personnel
 Natalie Cole – lead vocals
 Linda Williams – acoustic piano, Fender Rhodes
 Marvin Yancy – acoustic piano, Hammond organ, clavinet
 Sonny Burke – Hammond organ
 Michael Boddicker – synthesizer
 Criss Johnson, Ray Parker Jr., Lee Ritenour – guitar
 Larry Ball – bass guitar
 James Gadson, Donnell Hagan, Paul Humphrey, Teddy Sparks – drums
 Alan Estes – percussion
 Chuck Jackson – handclaps
 Hal Brooks – handclaps
 Gene Barge – alto saxophone solo (6), arrangements
 Richard Evans – arrangements
 The Colettes – backing vocals (1-4, 5, 7, 8)
 The N Sisters – backing vocals (1-4, 5, 7, 8)
 Anita Anderson – backing vocals (6)
 Yasmine "Sissy" Peoples – backing vocals (6)

Production
 Producers – Chuck Jackson and Marvin Yancy 
 Co-Producer on Track 5 – Gene Barge
 Executive Producer – Larkin Arnold
 Engineer – Barney Perkins
 Assistant Engineers – Zollie Johnson and Lester Smith
 Mixed by Barney Perkins, Chuck Jackson and Marvin Yancy at Westlake Audio (Los Angeles, CA), assisted by Dean Rod
 Mastered by John Golden and Barney Perkins at Kendun Recorders (Burbank, CA).
 Art Direction – Roy Kohara
 Illustration – Craig Nelson 
 Management – Kevin Hunter
Janice Williams - spiritual advisor

Notes
R&B/pop group En Vogue recorded a cover of "Just Can't Stay Away" which appears on their 1990 debut album Born to Sing.
Singer Mary J. Blige recorded a cover version of "Our Love" for her 1997 album Share My World.

Charts

Weekly charts

Year-end charts

Singles

Certifications

References

External links
 Thankful at Discogs

1977 albums
Natalie Cole albums
Capitol Records albums